The Maryland–Penn State football rivalry is an American college football rivalry between the Maryland Terrapins and Penn State Nittany Lions. In a series dating back to 1917, Penn State has an overwhelming series advantage, having won 42 out of 46 games. When Maryland joined Penn State in the Big Ten Conference in 2014, this series became a yearly conference series with implications for the Big Ten East Division title.

Series history 
The teams first played in 1917. Penn State has thoroughly dominated the series, leading 42-3–1, with their longest winning streak being 24 games from 1962 to 1988.

Penn State and Maryland met in briefly interrupted stretches between 1917 and 1993, with a near-consecutive run played all but three years (1976, 1981, and 1983) between 1960 and 1993. However, the one-sided record belies what was often a competitive match-up until its final years. While Maryland only compiled one win and one tie, numerous games were narrowly lost by missed field goals and turnovers. In 1975, a field goal attempt by kicker Mike Sochko hit the upright with under a minute left; Maryland lost 15–13. On September 7, 1985, no. 7 Maryland missed two field goals in the fourth quarter, and no. 19 Penn State won 20–18 in a game considered an upset.

Aside from the painful memories for Maryland, both schools compete aggressively for recruits in the Baltimore–Washington metropolitan area and Delaware Valley. When they did play, the game held recruiting implications for the entire mid-Atlantic. A more recent example of the recruiting competition is Baltimore-area player Antonio Logan-El, who committed verbally to Maryland, but ultimately signed with Penn State on live TV in 2006. Penn State secured a large number of recruits from the Baltimore–Washington area with its 2006 class, including the 11th-overall 2009 NFL Draft pick, defensive end Aaron Maybin of Ellicott City, Maryland, who had considered attending Maryland.

The 1993 game, during Penn State's first season in the Big Ten Conference, was the last game in the series for over 20 years. Prior to Maryland's announcement to join the Big Ten, former Maryland head coach Ralph Friedgen and Penn State athletic spokesman Jeff Nelson had previously stated that the schools had undergone discussions in an attempt to schedule a rematch. Maryland and Penn State were unable to agree on the terms for a revival. In 2008, Maryland officials alleged that Penn State demanded a two-to-one ratio of home games, which Penn State officials denied. Maryland head coach Randy Edsall, then in his first year, looked forward to a resumption of the rivalry in 2011.

On November 19, 2012, Maryland announced that it would be joining the Big Ten Conference, effective July 1, 2014. Maryland was placed in the East Division along with Penn State, ensuring that the rivalry will be played on a yearly basis. Prior to Maryland joining the conference, Penn State coach James Franklin, speaking in Baltimore, Maryland, claimed the new Big Ten territory as "in-state" adding, "I know there other schools around here, but you might as well shut them down". Maryland coach Randy Edsall responded to Franklin: "Talk is cheap."

The first rematch was at Beaver Stadium on November 1, 2014. Prior to the game, Edsall said that he looked forward to creating a rivalry with Penn State, while Franklin said that he saw Maryland simply as a Big Ten opponent, not a rival. During the warmups, Maryland and Penn State players scuffled. During the scuffle Maryland star wide receiver Stefon Diggs made contact with a referee and was handed a one-game suspension after the game for violating the conference's sportsmanship policy. At the coin toss the captains of the Terps refused to shake hands with the Penn State captains. Maryland won 20–19 on a 43-yard field goal by Brad Craddock with 51 seconds left in the fourth quarter. Maryland wide receiver Stefon Diggs, coach Randy Edsall, and athletic director Kevin Anderson made public apologies to the Penn State President, coaching staff and players after being reprimanded by the Big Ten Conference.

After the 2014 game, Penn State went on to win every game in the series from 2015 to 2019. On October 24, 2015, Penn State won 31–30 at M&T Bank Stadium in Baltimore in a game with eight total turnovers committed by both teams, three by Penn State and five by Maryland. Christian Hackenberg passed for 315 yards and three touchdowns for Penn State.

The series began rotating between the two campuses' stadiums in 2016, and Penn State won by lopsided scores in the four games from 2016 to 2019. During that time, local media debated if the series could be considered a rivalry. Prior to the 2015 season, the Hanover Evening Sun in Hanover, Pennsylvania published two columns debating the status of the rivalry. Zach Miller wrote that Maryland–Penn State football games "are still a long way from rivalry status." In contrast, Brandon Stoneburg said that the 2014 Maryland win was the start of "a new era of Penn State vs. Maryland football, an era that is indeed a rivalry." Steve Heiser wrote in 2016 for the York Dispatch that Maryland is the closest true rival to Penn State due to the campuses' home states bordering each other, the schools competing for recruits, and the close scores of the last two games.

Entering the game as 27.5-point underdogs, Maryland defeated Penn State 35–19 on November 7, 2020 at Beaver Stadium and ended Penn State's five-game winning streak in the series.

Game results

See also  
 List of NCAA college football rivalry games

References

College football rivalries in the United States
Maryland Terrapins football
Penn State Nittany Lions football
Maryland Terrapins rivalries
Big Ten Conference rivalries